Cumberbatch is an English surname. Variations include Cumberpatch, Cumberidge, Cumberledge, Comberbeach, Comberbach, Comberedge and Camberbirch.

Notable persons with that surname include:
Archie Cumberbatch (1879–?), West Indian cricketer
Benedict Cumberbatch (born 1976), English actor
Clyde Cumberbatch (born 1936), Trinidadian cricket umpire
Francis Cumberbatch, Guyanese lawyer and judge
Henry Arnold Cumberbatch (1858–1918), British diplomat
Henry Carlton Cumberbatch (1900–1966), British navy officer
James Cumberbatch (1909–1972), English professional rugby league footballer
Jane Cumberbatch, British interior designer
Robert William Cumberbatch (1821–1876), British diplomat
Stephen Cumberbatch (1909–2011), West Indian Anglican priest
Timothy Carlton (born 1939), born Timothy Carlton Cumberbatch, English character actor, father of Benedict Cumberbatch
Tulivu-Donna Cumberbatch, American jazz singer
Val Cumberbatch (1911–1973), English professional rugby league footballer

See also
Keith Cumberpatch (1927–2013), New Zealand field hockey player

References

English-language surnames
Surnames of English origin